Crystal Springs is an unincorporated community in Stark County, in the U.S. state of Ohio.

History
A post office was established at Crystal Springs in 1874, and remained in operation until 1916. Besides the post office, Crystal Springs had a gristmill.

References

Unincorporated communities in Stark County, Ohio
Unincorporated communities in Ohio